Sanyogita Ghorpade (born 5 November 1992) is an Indian badminton player. She trained at the Gopichand Badminton Academy for four years, but returned to the Nikhil Kanetkar Badminton Academy in Balewadi, Pune after the injuries. She was the women's doubles runner-up at the 2013 Bahrain International Series and Challenge tournament. She was Part of North eastern warriors in Season 3 Of PBL and in Season 4 she will play for Awadhe warriors. She has also represented India in world championship and Uber Cup.

Achievements

BWF World Tour (1 runner-up) 
The BWF World Tour, which was announced on 19 March 2017 and implemented in 2018, is a series of elite badminton tournaments sanctioned by the Badminton World Federation (BWF). The BWF World Tours are divided into levels of World Tour Finals, Super 1000, Super 750, Super 500, Super 300 (part of the HSBC World Tour), and the BWF Tour Super 100.

Women's doubles

BWF International Challenge/Series (5 runners-up) 
Women's doubles

  BWF International Challenge tournament
  BWF International Series tournament

References

External links
 

1992 births
Living people
Indian female badminton players
Racket sportspeople from Pune
Sportswomen from Maharashtra
21st-century Indian women
21st-century Indian people